The University ice stadium at the Harbin Sport University was the venue for the B Division of the 2018 Bandy World Championship. It has an audience capacity of 6,000 people.

Sources

Bandy venues in China